A deer dance is any of the world's folk dances performed by people dressed as deer.

India
 Manattam in Tamil Nadu

Japan
 Deer dance (鹿踊) is widely practised in Japan, particularly in Northeastern Japan.
 Deer dance in the style of Kanezu (video)

Mexico

 The Danza del Venado of the Mayo and Yaqui people of Sonora and Sinaloa

United Kingdom
 Abbots Bromley Horn Dance

See also
 Lion dance
 Tiger dance
 Folk dances of Mexico
 Yaqui music

References

English folk dance
Dances of Japan
Latin American folk dances
Native American dances
Indian folk dances
Deer and moose in popular culture
Ritual animal disguise
Ritual dances